The Dodge Ramcharger is a large sport utility vehicle built by Dodge from 1974 to 1993, based on a shortened-wheelbase version of the Dodge D Series/Ram pickup truck chassis. A Plymouth version, named the Plymouth Trail Duster, offered from 1974 to 1981, was Plymouth's only SUV.

The Ramcharger was mostly produced as a two-door, 4x4 vehicle, although a two-wheel drive version was available. As a full-size SUV, it competed with the Chevrolet K5 Blazer and the 1978–1996 Ford Bronco.

The Ramcharger was discontinued at the end of the 1993 model year in North America. In Mexico, however, production continued until 1996. It was then brought back from 1999 to 2001, still as a two-door SUV and sharing the design of the contemporary Ram pickup. Approximately 30,000 were produced and were all two-wheel drive.

First generation: 1974–1980

During development, it was known as the "Rhino". The Ramcharger/Trail Duster were built using a version of the Dodge Ram's Chrysler AD platform with a nine-inch shorter wheelbase. Originally available in four-wheel drive exclusively, a rear-wheel drive only version was available starting in 1975. The 1974 through 1980 models came without a roof, with a dealer-installed fabric top, or an optional removable steel roof with a flip up rear tailgate window. The early 1974 year model differs from the others in that its door pillars are attached to the removable roof. The "half doors" were used up to the build date of 6-10-74, afterwards the roof was changed to use normal pickup style doors. Marketed as a basic utility vehicle, only the driver's seat was standard equipment with the passenger seat optional up to 1976. Also available was an insulated center console for keeping items cool when filled with ice.

The Ramcharger was entered in rallying and placed first in the 1975 Sno*Drift event.

Second generation: 1981–1993

The Ramcharger and Trail Duster followed the D-series pickup's 1981 redesign into the Ram and is considered the second generation. They had an egg crate-style grille which was used until the 1986 model year, when the front was redesigned to the crosshair grille that remains common on many Dodges today. In 1991, there were another batch of grill changes that lasted until 1993 when American Ramcharger production stopped. The generation two trucks had a few different trim and interior option levels, but not much changed over the years. These models had a non-removable welded steel top instead of the removable top. The Trail Duster was only available for one year with the Ram design and steel non-removable top, as it was dropped after the 1981 model year.

From 1981 through 1987, all models were carbureted, but in 1988, throttle-body fuel injection (TBI) was added to the 318 ci V8 engine. Fuel injection was added to the 360 ci V8 engine in 1989. In 1992, the multiport fuel injected Magnum 318 was the standard engine while the LA 360 with TBI was still offered as an option. In 1993, the Magnum 360 replaced the LA engine.

Many manual transmissions were offered throughout the years, starting with the A-230 three-speed and ending with the A-535 five-speed in 1992. The NP435 "granny gear" 4 speed was the most common in 4WD models, as well as the close ratio version, the NP445. In 1988 the clutch was converted from a mechanical linkage to a hydraulic system. Automatic transmission models had the Chrysler Loadflite TF-727A or B until, in 1991, it was replaced with the A-500/A-518 four-speed.

An all-wheel-drive NP-203 transfer case was standard until 1980, when it was replaced with the part-time NP-208. This was supplanted by the NP-241 in 1988. Axles were Dana 44 front and 9¼" or 8 1/4" Chrysler corporate rear. AWD models (1973–1979) were equipped with the full-time version of the Dana 44 that had no provision for locking hubs and had a front wheel bearing design with a somewhat dubious reputation. In 1978 when the part-time 4WD system was introduced, the front Dana 44 was equipped with a more conventional front wheel bearing design and automatic locking hubs. Late in the 1984 model year the Dana 44 was switched to a CAD (Center Axle Disconnect) version. The CAD Dana 44 was vacuum actuated by a switch on the transfer case and powered by engine vacuum. The CAD Dana 44 was carried on until the end of Ramcharger production in 1993. The vacuum switch on the transfer case would occasionally fail and either leave the CAD engaged or not engage the CAD at all. Limited slip differentials were available for the 9¼" rear axle. The AWD versions used a 5 on 4½" wheel bolt circle and the part-time 4WD models used a 5 on 5½" bolt circle.  Two wheel drive models used the 5 on 4.5" wheel bolt circle and in 1985 changed to the 5 on 5.5" pattern.

The Ramcharger continued to be sold in Mexico until 1996, with minor running changes from the last version sold in the U.S. and Canada  in 1993.

Third generation: 1999–2001

The third generation Ramcharger was produced in Mexico from 1998 for the 1999 model year, based on the same platform as the Dodge Ram pickup and sharing most of its componentry with the Ram as well. It had also shared some of its parts and components with the third generation Chrysler minivans (Chrysler Town & Country, Dodge Caravan/Plymouth Voyager) as well. It was only sold in Mexico where the previous generation Ramcharger had been successful. It was available in the ST, SLT, SLT Plus and Sport trim levels.

One of the features of this generation was a small third row folding seat in the cargo area that faced sideways, making it less practical for long trips. The rear of the vehicle had looked very similar to the 1996-2000 model Chrysler minivans.

See also
 List of Dodge automobiles

References

External links

Ramcharger
Rear-wheel-drive vehicles
All-wheel-drive vehicles
Full-size sport utility vehicles
Cars introduced in 1974
1980s cars
1990s cars